Christina Hansen  (born 5 June 1970) is a Danish footballer who played as a forward for the Denmark women's national football team. She was part of the team at the 1995 FIFA Women's World Cup.

References

External links
 

1970 births
Living people
Danish women's footballers
Denmark women's international footballers
Place of birth missing (living people)
1995 FIFA Women's World Cup players
Women's association football forwards